Gafanha da Nazaré is a city and parish (freguesia) in the Ílhavo Municipality, in Portugal. The population in 2011 was 15,240, in an area of 16.44 km2.

Population

Buildings
 Casa Gafanhoa
 Navio Museu Santo André
 Igreja Matriz da Gafanha da Nazaré

Sports
G.D. Gafanha, founded in 1957, is a sports club  mainly known for its football team which competes in the third tier of Portuguese league system since 2014–15 season. The club has also teams competing in other sports as futsal, basketball and athletics.

References

Cities in Portugal
Freguesias of Ílhavo